The Conjuring is a 2013 American supernatural horror film directed by James Wan and written by Chad Hayes and Carey W. Hayes. It is the inaugural film in The Conjuring Universe franchise. Patrick Wilson and Vera Farmiga star as Ed and Lorraine Warren, paranormal investigators and authors associated with prominent cases of haunting. Their purportedly real-life reports inspired The Amityville Horror story and film franchise. The Warrens come to the assistance of the Perron family, who experienced increasingly disturbing events in their newly occupied farmhouse in Rhode Island in 1971.

Development of the film began in January 2012, and reports confirmed Wan as the director of a film entitled The Warren Files, later retitled The Conjuring, centering on the alleged real-life exploits of Ed and Lorraine Warren, a married couple who investigated paranormal events. In his second collaboration with Wan, Patrick Wilson starred alongside Vera Farmiga in the main roles of Ed and Lorraine. Production commenced in Wilmington, North Carolina, in February 2012, and scenes were shot in chronological order.

The Conjuring was released in the United States and Canada on July 19, 2013, by Warner Bros. Pictures and New Line Cinema. It received positive reviews from critics, who praised the performances, direction, screenplay, atmosphere, and musical score. It grossed over $319million worldwide against its $20million budget. A sequel, The Conjuring 2, was released in 2016.

Plot 
In 1971, Roger and Carolyn Perron move into a farmhouse in Harrisville, Rhode Island, with their five daughters: Andrea, Nancy, Christine, Cindy, and April. Their dog, Sadie, refuses to enter the house and the entrance to a cellar has been boarded up. Paranormal events occur within the first few nights. Every clock in the house stops at 3:07 AM. Sadie is found dead in the morning, and Carolyn wakes up with large bruises. She and Christine both encounter a malevolent spirit.

Carolyn contacts demonologists Ed and Lorraine Warren, who have recently investigated a possessed doll called Annabelle. The Warrens meet with Carolyn and agree to conduct an initial investigation, during which Lorraine, a clairvoyant, sees that dark forces have latched on to the Perron family, and leaving the house will not free them. To gather evidence, they place cameras and bells around the house with the help of their assistant Drew Thomas and police officer Brad Hamilton. Further research reveals that the house once belonged to an accused witch named Bathsheba Sherman (a relative of Mary Towne Eastey), who sacrificed her week-old baby to the devil and killed herself in 1863 at 3:07 in the morning after cursing all who take her land. There are reports of numerous murders and suicides through the years in the houses that were built on the property.

One morning, Bathsheba appears to Carolyn and fully possesses her. That night, the group hears a spirit luring Cindy into the wardrobe, where she reveals a secret passage. Lorraine enters the passage and falls down to the cellar, where she sees the spirit of a woman whom Bathsheba had possessed long ago and used to kill her child. Bathsheba attacks Nancy; the incident is caught on camera. The Warrens conclude it is sufficient evidence to receive authorization from the Catholic Church to perform an exorcism but Father Gordon explains that approval would have to come directly from the Vatican because the Perron family aren't members of the church.

The Warrens' daughter Judy is attacked in the Warrens' own home by Bathsheba. The Perron family takes refuge at a motel but Carolyn takes Christine and April back to the house to kill them. Ed, Lorraine, and Brad find Carolyn in the cellar trying to stab Christine. Lorraine warns that if they take Carolyn outside the house, Bathsheba will kill her. They tie Carolyn to a chair and Ed attempts the exorcism himself. Though Carolyn escapes and attempts to kill April, Lorraine is able to call to her by reminding her of a special memory she shared with her family, allowing Ed to complete the exorcism, lift Bathsheba's curse and condemn her back to Hell. Returning home, Ed adds the haunted music box from the Perrons' home to their room of cursed artifacts that they have collected from past cases. As he leaves, the music box starts playing on its own.

Cast 

 Vera Farmiga as Lorraine Warren
 Patrick Wilson as Ed Warren
 Lili Taylor as Carolyn Perron
 Ron Livingston as Roger Perron
 Shanley Caswell as Andrea 
 Hayley McFarland as Nancy 
 Joey King as Christine 
 Mackenzie Foy as Cindy 
 Kyla Deaver as April 
 Shannon Kook as Drew 
 John Brotherton as Brad 
 Sterling Jerins as Judy Warren
 Marion Guyot as Georgiana 
 Morganna May as Debbie
 Amy Tipton as Camilla
 Zach Pappas as Rick
 Joseph Bishara as Bathsheba 
 Christof Veillon as Maurice 
 Steve Coulter as Father Gordon
 Lorraine Warren as woman in audience (uncredited)

Production

Development 
Producer Tony DeRosa-Grund wrote the original treatment and titled the project The Conjuring. For nearly 14 years, he tried to get the movie made without any success. He landed a deal to make the movie at Gold Circle Films, the production company behind The Haunting in Connecticut, but a contract could not be finalized and the deal was dropped.

DeRosa-Grund allied with producer Peter Safran, and sibling writers Chad and Carey W. Hayes were brought on board to refine the script. Using DeRosa-Grund's treatment and the Ed Warren tape, the Hayes brothers changed the story's point of view from the Perron family to the Warrens'. The brothers interviewed Lorraine Warren many times over the phone to clarify details. By mid-2009, the property became the subject of a six-studio bidding war that landed the film at Summit Entertainment. However, DeRosa-Grund and Summit could not conclude the transaction and the film went into turnaround. DeRosa-Grund reconnected with New Line Cinema, who had lost in the original bidding war but who ultimately picked up the film. On November 11, 2009, a deal was made between New Line and DeRosa-Grund's Evergreen Media Group.

Pre-production 

Pre-production began in early 2011, with reports surfacing in early June that James Wan was in talks to direct the film. This was later confirmed by Warner Bros., which also stated that the film would be loosely based on real-life events surrounding Ed and Lorraine Warren. In January 2012, Vera Farmiga and Patrick Wilson were cast to star in the film. That month, Ron Livingston and Lili Taylor were also confirmed for roles in the film, which at that time was developing under the working title of The Untitled Warren Files Project. The film's title was temporarily changed to The Warren Files based on a suggestion by Wan, but was later reverted to The Conjuring prior to the commencement of the film's marketing campaign.

In preparation for their roles, Farmiga and Wilson traveled to Connecticut to spend time with Lorraine Warren, who also visited the set during production. Over the course of spending three days at the Warren home, both actors took in information that could not otherwise be achieved from secondary research. "I just wanted to absorb her essence. I wanted to see the details, she has such mad style. I just wanted to see – the way she communicates with her hands, these gestures, her smile, how she moves through space," said Farmiga on her observations of Warren.

Filming 
Principal photography began in late February 2012. Lasting for 38 days, shooting took place primarily at EUE/Screen Gems Studios as well as other locations in and around Wilmington, North Carolina. Filming also took place at the University of North Carolina Wilmington in March 2012 while the campus was on its spring break. Diana Walsh Pasulka, professor of Religious Studies at UNC-Wilmington, was the chief religious consultant for the project. Lorraine Warren spent some time observing the shoot and later recalled that she had expressed no qualms to the filmmakers with how her story was adapted. After wrapping up in Wilmington on April 20, the film concluded its principal photography on April 26, 2012. All scenes were shot in chronological order.

Post-production 
The film was in post-production in August of the same year. Around 20 to 30 minutes of footage was removed from the first cut of the film, which initially ran at about two hours in duration. After positive test screenings, the final edit of the film was locked in December 2012 and awaited its summer release.

Music 
The musical score for The Conjuring was composed by Joseph Bishara, who previously collaborated with director Wan on Insidious (2011). "James asked me early on about [The Conjuring] while the film was still coming together", explained Bishara on his involvement. "The studio and producers were very supportive in allowing him to bring along who he wanted, with many of his longtime crew from Insidious and even earlier returning." Further into the development process, Wan offered Bishara the chance to act in the film, which he had previously done in Insidious. "We talked about music first and then James had mentioned that he might want me to play one of the entities in this. After reading the script it turned out it was Bathsheba," said Bishara. Because of his early involvement, Bishara was given more time to work out the musical palette of the film. "For whatever reason I was hearing brass clustering as an early response to the material, a quiet shimmering flutter tongue effect, and it grew from there", said Bishara on his creative process.

A soundtrack album was released by La-La Land Records and WaterTower Music on July 16, 2013. In addition to Bishara's themes, the soundtrack also includes a track titled "Family Theme" by composer Mark Isham. Avant-garde musician Diamanda Galás also contributed to Bishara's score, performing raw vocal improvisation on top of the previously recorded brass instrumentation. Other songs featured in the film include: "In the Room Where you Sleep" by Dead Man's Bones, "Sleep Walk" by Betsy Brye and "Time of the Season" by The Zombies.

Release

Marketing 
The first promotional images were released in November 2012, introducing Farmiga and Wilson as Ed and Lorraine Warren. A teaser trailer, previously shown at the 2012 New York Comic Con, kicked off the film's marketing campaign in February 2013. Throughout the campaign, the film was promoted heavily as "based on a true story." In the weeks leading up to the film's release, trailers and TV spots began to feature the real-life Perron family. This was followed by a featurette titled The Devil's Hour in which Lorraine Warren and other paranormal investigators explain some of the supernatural occurrences seen in the film.

Theatrical run 
Warner Bros. and New Line Cinema initially intended to release The Conjuring in early 2013 but decided on a summer release date after gaining a positive reception from test audiences. The film was ultimately released on July 19 in North America, and in the United Kingdom and in India on August 2. Because of this, it is one of the first horror films to receive a wide release in the United States during the months of June or July since 2006's The Omen. A trailer and a clip from the film were shown at the 2012 New York Comic Con. In March 2013, the film was given an R-rating by the MPAA for being what Wan described as "too adult." "When we sent it [to the MPAA], they gave us the R-rating," said executive producer Walter Hamada. "When we asked them why, they basically said, 'It's just so scary. [There are] no specific scenes or tone you could take out to get it PG-13.'" The film is rated 15 by the BBFC.

The world premiere took place at the closing night of the first edition of Nocturna: Madrid International Fantastic Film Festival on June 6, 2013. This was followed by two screenings of the film at the Los Angeles Film Festival on June 21 that also featured a Q&A segment with director James Wan. A red carpet premiere was then held for the film at Cinerama Dome in Los Angeles on July 15, 2013.

Home media 
The Conjuring was released in DVD and Blu-ray formats by Warner Home Video on October 22, 2013.In May 31, 2022, it was released alongside other The Conjuring Universe films, excluding The Curse of La Llorona, in Blu-ray format.

Reception

Box office 
The Conjuring conjured $137.4million in North America and $182.1million in other territories for a worldwide total of $319.5million, against a budget of $20million.

In North America, the film opened on July 19, 2013, alongside Red 2, Turbo and R.I.P.D., and was projected to gross $30–$35million from 2,903 theaters in its opening weekend. The film earned $3.3million from its Thursday night showings and $17million on its first day (including Thursday previews), doing slightly better than The Purge a month earlier. The film went on to gross $41.9million in its opening weekend, landing in first place and breaking The Purges record as the biggest opening for an original R-rated horror film. For Warner Bros., The Conjuring surpassed the debut weekend of the distributor's big-budget film Pacific Rim, which had opened to $37.3million the weekend prior. While horror films usually drop at least 50% in their second weekend, The Conjuring only dropped 47%, taking in $22.2million and placing in second behind new release The Wolverine. After its run in theaters, the film was officially named a box office hit, grossing over fifteen times its production budget with a worldwide total of $318million. Calculating in all production and promotional expenses, Deadline Hollywood estimated that the film made a total profit of $161.7million.

Outside North America, the film had a total gross of $180.6million from all its international markets. In Australia, it grossed $1.8million in its debut weekend, placing third at the box office behind The Heat and This Is the End. Its total gross in Australia was $8.2million. In the United Kingdom, the film opened on August 6 alongside The Smurfs 2, making £2.6million ($3.3million) in its opening weekend, and grossing $16.2million in total there. It had its biggest international gross in Mexico, opening in first place on August 23, where the film made $18.9million overall.

Critical response 
The review aggregation website Rotten Tomatoes reports an 86% approval rating based on 226 reviews and an average rating of 7.2/10. The website's critical consensus reads, "Well-crafted and gleefully creepy, The Conjuring ratchets up dread through a series of effective old-school scares." Metacritic assigned the film a weighted average score of 68 out of 100 based on 35 critics, indicating "generally favorable reviews". CinemaScore reported that audiences gave The Conjuring an "A−" grade on a scale of A to F; it was the first horror film to receive an A grade from the company.

In her review following the Los Angeles Film Festival, Sheri Linden of The Hollywood Reporter said, "With its minimal use of digital effects, its strong, sympathetic performances and ace design work, the pic harks back in themes and methods to The Exorcist and The Amityville Horror, not quite attaining the poignancy and depth of the former but far exceeding the latter in sheer cinematic beauty." Justin Chang of Variety gave the film a positive review, calling the film "a sensationally entertaining old-school freakout and one of the smartest, most viscerally effective thrillers in recent memory."  Alonso Duralde of TheWrap also praised the effectiveness of the film, explaining that it "doesn't try to reinvent the tropes of horror movies, whether it's ghosts or demons or exorcisms, but Fred Astaire didn't invent tap-dancing, either." Chris Nashawaty of Entertainment Weekly gave the film an A−, citing the effectiveness of "mood and sound effects for shocks that never feel cheap."

Some critics reacted negatively to the film's similarities with films such as The Exorcist and Poltergeist. Indiewire's Eric Kohn explained that, "The Warrens may know how to handle demonic possessions, but The Conjuring suffers from a different invading force: the ghosts of familiarity." Andrew O'Hehir of Salon said the film provided "all the scream-inducing shocks you could want, right on schedule", but thought the central concept – that the innocent women accused and executed in the Salem witch trials "actually were witches, who slaughtered children and pledged their love to Satan and everything!" – was "reprehensible and inexcusable bullshit".

Accolades

Legal disputes 
Norma Sutcliffe and Gerald Helfrich, the previous owners of the house on which the film was based, sued James Wan, Warner Bros. and other producers in 2015, on the ground that their property was being vandalized constantly as a consequence of the film. Entertainment Weekly obtained documents in which the owners affirmed various invasions and ratified that they had found numerous objects affiliated with satanic cults. The lawsuit also revealed that the previous owners bought the house in 1987 and lived "in peace" until 2012. Both owners were seeking unspecified damages. When questioned, a spokesperson for Warner Bros. declined to comment on the issue.

Gerald Brittle, the author of the 1980 book The Demonologist about Ed and Lorraine Warren, filed a lawsuit against Warner Bros., New Line Productions and director James Wan regarding the film. Brittle claimed the film, alongside the subsequent sequel and spin-offs, infringed upon an exclusive contract he had with the Warrens to make any works based on the subject of his book. The film rights were briefly with the original publisher Prentice Hall before reverting to Brittle. Warner Bros. refused to comment on the case. Warner Bros. settled the case with Brittle in December 2017.

Legacy

The Conjuring 2 

In June 2013, it was reported that New Line Cinema was already developing a sequel. Both Farmiga and Wilson were signed on to reprise their roles for an additional film. The Conjuring 2 was scheduled to be released on October 23, 2015, but in October 2014, Warner Bros. moved the film's release date to an unspecified 2016 release date. On October 21, it was announced that James Wan would return to direct the sequel. On November 11, 2014, the film was set for a June 10, 2016, release. The sequel was later re-written by David Leslie Johnson, with a script from Chad and Carey W. Hayes and Wan. The film deals with the Enfield poltergeist case, which occurred in London from 1977 to 1979. It also depicts the Warrens' investigation of the Amityville haunting. Principal photography began in September 2015 in Los Angeles, and concluded in December 2015 in London.

Franchise 

The success of The Conjuring has spawned several related films and sequels. Along with the original film, there is 2016's The Conjuring 2 and The Conjuring: The Devil Made Me Do It, which was released in 2021. Three films about the Annabelle doll have been made: 2014's Annabelle, its prequel Annabelle: Creation from 2017, and a sequel to both films Annabelle Comes Home from 2019. Another film featuring supernatural threat first seen in The Conjuring films which include The Nun, released in 2018. In 2022, a sequel, The Nun 2, is in works, and Conjuring 4, is in development

See also 
 List of horror films
 List of horror films of 2013

References

External links 
 
 
 
 
 

Conjuring 1
2010s American films
Conjuring 1
2013 films
2013 horror films
American ghost films
American haunted house films
American horror thriller films
American supernatural horror films
Filicide in fiction
Films about curses
Films about exorcism
Films about Satanism
Films about sleep disorders
Films about spirit possession
Films about witchcraft
Films directed by James Wan
Films produced by Peter Safran
Films scored by Joseph Bishara
Films set in 1968
Films set in 1971
Films set in Connecticut
Films set in Massachusetts
Films set in Rhode Island
Films shot in North Carolina
Horror films based on actual events
New Line Cinema films
Religious horror films
Salem witch trials in fiction
Warner Bros. films